The men's triple jump event at the 1990 Commonwealth Games was held on 2 and 3 February at the Mount Smart Stadium in Auckland.

Medalists

Results

Qualification
Qualification: 16.65 m (Q) or at least 12 best (q) qualified for the final.

Final

References

Qualification results

Athletics at the 1990 Commonwealth Games
1990